Srikaya or serikaya can refer to:

Sugar-apple, a tropical fruit from the genus Annona
Kaya (jam), a food spread from Southeast Asia